A Caprice of Darling Caroline (French: Un caprice de Caroline chérie) is a 1953 French historical comedy film directed by Jean Devaivre and starring Martine Carol, Jacques Dacqmine and Marthe Mercadier. It is based on the 1950 novel of the same title by Jacques Laurent. It was the sequel to the 1951 hit Darling Caroline.

It was shot at the Boulogne Studios in Paris. The film's sets were designed by the art director Jacques Krauss. It was one of the first French films to be shot in Technicolor.

Cast
 Martine Carol as Caroline de Bièvre
 Jacques Dacqmine as Gaston de Sallanches
 Marthe Mercadier as Ida
 Véra Norman as Comtesse Paolina Ruccelli
 Jean Pâqui as Le capitaine de Cépoys
 Jean-Claude Pascal as Livio
 Denise Provence as Comtesse Clélia de Montelone
 Jean Tissier as Le trésorier-payeur
 Mady Berry as Marquise de Montelone
 Christine Carère as Chekina
 Gil Delamare as Lieutenant Berthier
 Jacques Dufilho as Giuseppe
 Claire Maurier as Jeannette - la camériste de Caroline
 René Mazé as Le tambour
 Alexandre Rignault as Le violeur

References

Bibliography
 Crisp, C.G. The Classic French Cinema, 1930-1960. Indiana University Press, 1993.
 Goble, Alan. The Complete Index to Literary Sources in Film. Walter de Gruyter, 1999.

External links
 

1953 films
1950s historical comedy films
French historical comedy films
French epic films
1950s French-language films
French black-and-white films
Films based on French novels
Films directed by Jean Devaivre
Films with screenplays by Jean Anouilh
Films shot at Boulogne Studios
Gaumont Film Company films
Films based on works by Jacques Laurent
1950s French films